The Frew River is an ephemeral river in the Northern Territory of Australia.

The headwaters of the river are located in the Davenport Range near the southern boundary of the Iytwelepenty / Davenport Range National Park and the river flows in a northerly direction through the park passing through a series of waterholes including; Junction Waterhole, Old Police Station Waterhole, Burrabelly Waterhole, Rooney Waterhole and Woodenjerrie Waterhole and eventually discharges in Walkabout Creek.

The only tributaries to the creek are Lennee Creek and Mia Mia Creek.

Epenarra Station has  of river frontage including some seasonal lagoons along Frew River.

The Indigenous Alyawarre peoples are the traditional owners of the area, having inhabited the area for tens of thousands of years. Europeans arrived in the area in the 1890s using the plains beside the river for cattle grazing.

See also

References

Rivers of the Northern Territory